The Sudanian savanna is a broad belt of tropical savanna that runs east and west across the African continent, from the Atlantic Ocean in the west to the Ethiopian Highlands in the east. The Sahel, a belt of drier grasslands and acacia savannas, lies to the north, between the Sudanian savanna and the Sahara Desert. To the south the forest-savanna mosaic forms a transition zone between the Sudanian savanna and the Guineo-Congolian forests that lie nearer the equator.

Ecoregions 
The World Wide Fund for Nature divides the Sudanian savanna into two ecoregions, separated by the Mandara Mountains. The West Sudanian savanna runs from the Atlantic Ocean to eastern Nigeria. The East Sudanian savanna extends eastwards from the Mandara Mountains to the western lowlands of Ethiopia.

Physiographic province 
The Sudanian savanna is one of the three distinct physiographic provinces of the larger African Massive division. Physiography divides this province into three distinct physiographic sections, the Niger Basin, the Lake Chad Basin, and the Middle Nile Basin.

Flora 

The Sudanian savanna is characterized by the coexistence of trees and grasses. Dominant tree species are often belonging to the Combretaceae and Caesalpinioideae, some Acacia species are also important. The dominant grass species are usually Andropogoneae, especially the genera Andropogon and Hyparrhenia, on shallow soils also Loudetia and Aristida. Much of the Sudanian savanna region is used in the form of parklands, where useful trees, such as shea, baobab, locust-bean tree and others are spared from cutting, while sorghum, maize, millet or other crops are cultivated beneath.

Fauna
Many large mammals are native to the Sudanian savanna, including African bush elephant (Loxodonta africana), northern giraffe (Giraffa camelopardalis), giant eland (Taurotragus derbianus derbianus), roan antelope (Hippotragus equinus), African buffalo (Syncerus caffer brachyceros), lion (Panthera leo), leopard (Panthera pardus) cheetah (Acinonyx jubatus), and African wild dog (Lycaon pictus). Most large mammals are now very limited in range and numbers.

Land use
The Sudanian savanna is used by both pastoralists and farmers. Cattle are predominantly the livestock kept, but in some areas, sheep and goats are also kept. The main crops grown are sorghum and millet which are suited to the low levels of rainfall. With increasing levels of drought since the 1970s, pastoralists have needed to move southwards to search for grazing areas and have come into conflict with more settled agriculturalists.

See also 
 Neolithic Subpluvial — ancient Green Sahara
 Sub-Saharan Africa
 Sudan (region)
 Sudd — swamp in South Sudan

References 

Afrotropical ecoregions
Ecoregions of Africa
Grasslands of Africa
Ecoregions of Cameroon
Ecoregions of Chad
Ecoregions of Ethiopia
Ecoregions of Nigeria
Ecoregions of Sudan
Physiographic provinces
Regions of Africa
Tropical and subtropical grasslands, savannas, and shrublands

zh:苏丹草原